Anthony Grey is a British journalist.

Anthony Grey or Tony Grey may also refer to:

Anthony Grey, Earl of Harold (1695–1723), British peer and courtier
Anthony Grey, 11th Earl of Kent (1645–1702)
Anthony Grey, 9th Earl of Kent (1557–1643)
Antony Grey (1927–2010), English LGBT rights activist

See also
Anthony Gray (disambiguation)